Mackler is a surname. Notable people with the surname include:

People with the surname
Aaron L. Mackler (fl. from 2000), American rabbi 
Carolyn Mackler (born 1973), American author
Dan Mackler, director of the 2007 film The Karaoke King 
Jacob Mackler, American gang lawyer killed in 1923 by gang leader William Colbeck 
Jeff Mackler (fl. from 2006), American activist  
Paul Mackler, CEO of Cygnus Business Media, 2000-2006
Ronald Mackler, key figure in the development of BMX racing 
Stephen D. Mackler, director of Neon Maniacs (1986 film), Voodoo Dawn, and other horror films

Fictional characters
Henry Mackler, in One Life to Live

See also
Meckler, a surname
Mickler, a surname
Makeléer, a Swedish noble family